Battery Park, NYC July 4th 2008 is a live album by American noise punk band Sonic Youth, recorded at the River to River Festival in Battery Park, New York, on July 4, 2008. It was released June 9, 2009, coinciding with the release of The Eternal. It has only been released on vinyl and digital services. The album was mixed at Echo Canyon West, a studio often used by the band.

Reception

The album has been positively received by critics. In a review for Pitchfork, Susan Elizabeth Shepard says that while the album "isn’t their best or most comprehensive live document", it is further proof of how consistent their genius was and how enduring the qualities that made them such a special live act".

Track listing

Personnel
Adapted from LP liner notes.
Kim Gordon, Lee Ranaldo, Mark Ibold, Steve Shelley, Thurston Moore – band
Dan Mapp, Eric Baccht, Jeremy Lemos, Matt Zivich, Nic Close, Robin Easton – "Sonic Crew"
Aaron Mullan – engineer, live mix
John Golden – mastering
Stefano Giovannini – photography

References

2009 live albums
Sonic Youth live albums
Matador Records live albums